Valeriya Zhandarova (born 17 March 1994) is a  Georgian long-distance runner who specialises in the 5000 metres. She holds the Georgian national record for the distance, with her best of 15:33.10 minutes, as well as the national record for the 3000 metres steeplechase (10:13.69). Zhandarova initially competed for Russia.

Career
Internationally, she represented her country at the 2019 World Athletics Championships. She won two silver medals in the 3000 metres at the Balkan Athletics Indoor Championships in 2018 and 2019, finishing behind Albania's Luiza Gega both times. She was the gold medalist over that distance at the 2018 Championships of the Small States of Europe.

She made her debut over the half marathon distance in Kraków in 2019, placing seventh with a time of 1:14:14 hours.

International competitions

References

External links

1994 births
Living people
Female long-distance runners from Georgia (country)
Russian female long-distance runners
Female steeplechase runners
World Athletics Championships athletes for Georgia (country)